The Battle of Athens (also known as the Battle of Piraeus Harbour) on 20 April 1941 is the name given by author Roald Dahl to a dog-fighting air battle over Athens fought for half an hour between the Royal Air Force and the Luftwaffe towards the end of the Battle of Greece.

Roald Dahl flew a Hawker Hurricane in the battle, which he describes in his second autobiography Going Solo and in the short story 'Katina'.

According to Dahl, the battle began when the twelve remaining Hurricanes of the Royal Air Force (RAF)'s 80 Squadron, flying in formation over Athens (to boost civilian morale) were attacked by a large group of German Luftwaffe aircraft, mostly Messerschmitt Bf 109s and Bf 110s along with some Junkers Ju 87s and Junkers Ju 88s. According to the citizens of Athens the Germans had 200 planes; according to Dahl, they had 152 bombers and fighters.

In the resulting battle four RAF pilots were shot down and killed, including the famous Marmaduke "Pat" Pattle and the Irish RAF pilot William "Timber" Woods, and one pilot lost his Hawker Hurricane but was able to escape. Dahl states that Greek observers counted 22 German aircraft shot down, although another source states that the Germans lost eight aircraft. Dahl escaped from Greece with the remnants of his squadron.

References

Aerial operations and battles of World War II involving Germany
Aerial operations and battles of World War II involving the United Kingdom
1941 in Greece
Conflicts in 1941
20th century in Athens
Military history of Athens
Athens